The 1989 Fuji Long Distance Series was the 13th season of this series, with all races being held at the Fuji International Speedway.

Fuji Long Distance

Results

References

JSPC seasons